This is a list of airports in Iran, grouped by type and sorted by location.

As of 2013, Iran had 319 airports which made Iran the 22nd country in the world with most airports.

Iran, officially the Islamic Republic of Iran, is a country in Central Eurasia and/or Western Asia. It is bordered on the north by Armenia, Azerbaijan, the Caspian Sea and Turkmenistan, on the east by Afghanistan and Pakistan, on the south by the Gulf of Oman and the Persian Gulf, on the west by Iraq and on the northwest by Turkey. The country's largest and capital city is Tehran.



Airports 

Airport names shown in bold have scheduled passenger service on commercial airlines.

Old airports route map in Iran

See also 
 List of airlines of Iran
 Busiest airports in Islamic Republic of Iran
 List of airports by ICAO code: O#OI - Iran
 List of Iranian Air Force bases
 Transport in Iran
 Wikipedia: WikiProject Aviation/Airline destination lists: Asia#Iran

References

Footnotes

External links

 Civil Aviation Organization of Iran
 Iran Airports Company

 
Iran
Airports
Airports
Iran